Marcelino Galoppo is an Argentine former footballer who represented his country at under-20 and under-23 level.

He was mainly a 2nd division player, but he had spells in the Primera Division Argentina and in the Scottish Premier League with Dundee United F.C.

His son, Giuliano, is a professional footballer.

References

External links

 Argentine Primera statistics
 BDFA profile

1970 births
Living people
Sportspeople from Córdoba Province, Argentina
Argentine footballers
Racing de Córdoba footballers
Deportivo Español footballers
Club Atlético Platense footballers
Quilmes Atlético Club footballers
Chacarita Juniors footballers
Talleres de Córdoba footballers
Atlético Tucumán footballers
Dundee United F.C. players
Argentinos Juniors footballers
Scottish Premier League players
Expatriate footballers in Scotland
Argentine expatriate footballers
S.S.D. Sanremese Calcio players
Argentine expatriate sportspeople in Italy
Argentine expatriate sportspeople in Scotland
Association football midfielders